"A Little in Love" is a song recorded by Cliff Richard, released as the second single from his 1980 album, I'm No Hero.

The song spent five months on the U.S. Billboard Hot 100, peaking at number 17. It reached number 15 on the UK Singles Chart, reached the Top 5 in Canada and was a hit in numerous European countries.

"A Little in Love" was the follow-up single to "Dreamin'" from Richard's I'm No Hero album.  Its release was delayed as a result of his intervening duet with Olivia Newton-John, "Suddenly" from the Xanadu soundtrack.

In the US and Canada, "A Little in Love" was followed by "Give a Little Bit More" as the third single from the album, while in Germany "A Little in Love" was released as the third single after "In the Night". The UK and most other regions had no third single released from the album.

Chart performance

Weekly charts

Year-end charts

References

External links
 

1980 songs
1980 singles
Cliff Richard songs
EMI Records singles
Songs written by Alan Tarney
Song recordings produced by Alan Tarney